The Hammer and the Cross is a science fiction novel  by Harry Harrison and John Holm, a pseudonym for the Tolkien scholar Tom Shippey. The first in a trilogy, the book chronicles the rise of Shef, a bastard son of a Viking and an English lady. The book is alternative history set in 9th century England, where Viking raids are common.

In this tale, the authors explore what might have happened if the Vikings had fought more successfully against the rule of Chalcedonian Christianity. Central to this story is the protagonist Shef. In the story, Shef's birth is discussed. Such as if Shef is the son of the Norse god Ríg, or of a Viking named Sigvarth. More widely, the story questions whether Shef's visions are messages from the gods or dreams. These questions are developed through the trilogy.

Plot summary

The story begins with Shef as little more than a thrall in his stepfather's service. When he is not busy with mundane tasks, Shef finds himself aiding the village blacksmith, where he develops his talents as well as an affinity for invention. A Viking army invades, and Shef's stepsister Godive is taken during a raid on their village. Shef and his friend Hund proceed to the encampment of the Ragnarssons, leaders of the invading army. Rising swiftly in and beyond the Viking army, Shef's greatest task becomes defeating a new invasion.

Reception

In a review, the Science Fiction Chronicle called the book a "swift-paced, historical science fiction story with an air of absolute authenticity. This is the way it might have, and perhaps should have been." 
A review in Runepebble called it "an interesting alternate history" and recommended it for older children as it was "violent but not without cause."

References

1993 British novels
British alternative history novels
Irish alternative history novels
Novels by Harry Harrison
Norse mythology in popular culture
Fictional Vikings
Novels set in the Viking Age
Works published under a pseudonym
The Hammer and the Cross series
Novels set in Europe
Collaborative novels
Legend Books books